Pļavnieki is a Riga neighbourhood situated to the right of the river Daugava.

Territory of the Pļavnieki for many centuries was used as agricultural land and was added to Riga only in 1974. The name "Pļavnieki" is derived from Latvian word "pļava" meaning meadow. Project of the new residential neighbourhood for 60,000 people was finished in 1978. Majority of the current residential buildings are built in 1980s. Pļavnieki is one of the most densely inhabited neighbourhoods in Riga.

The total area of the Pļavnieki neighborhood is 2,985 km², which is approximately 2/5 less than the average neighborhood area in Riga. The length of the perimeter of the neighborhood borders is 7,664 meters. The boundaries of the Pļavnieki neighborhood in nature are clearly readable as they follow major roads. The current building structure in Pļavnieki largely differs from the building structure in neighboring neighborhoods. Pļavnieki is a densely populated neighborhood with predominantly 9 to 16-story buildings, as well as individual 18-story buildings.

History 
The Pļavinieki neighborhood was annexed to the city of Riga in 1974. The Pļavnieki multi-storey residential district was primarily built in the 1980s on former agricultural lands (hence its name). The organization of the residential district's plan was determined by the "Pilsētprojekts" institute with a 1978 detailed plan of the territory, whose architects were Ēvalds Fogelis, Meinards Medinskis and Ivars Millers. 

The Pļavnieki residential district consists of five micro-neighborhoods with approximately 60,000 residents, as well as a public and commercial center along Andrejs Saharova Street (formerly Felix Dzerzhinsky Street). Pļavnieki is one of the most densely populated multi-storey residential districts in Riga, with mostly 9 to 16-storey buildings, but there are also individual 18-storey buildings on Lubānas Street, which were only completed in 1990. 

The Pļavnieki complex was intentionally designed similar to the early 20th century perimeter streets of Riga, which were supposed to have decorative sculptures, but this was never implemented. The Pļavnieki building project was developed by architects A. Āboliņš, Ēvalds Fogelis, Gunta Lukstiņa, Alīda Ozoliņa, and Lilija Saško.

Gallery 

Neighbourhoods in Riga